Ricardo Álvarez Lobo (Madrid, 7 July 1897 - Madrid, 21 February 1955) was a Spanish footballer who usually played as a left winger. The highlight of his career was scoring the winning goal of the 1917 Copa del Rey Final for Madrid FC in extra-time.

Club career
Born in Madrid, he began his career at his hometown club Racing de Madrid in 1915, where he played alongside Feliciano Rey, who also were teammates at Madrid FC. After a great season at Racing, he was signed by Madrid FC. In the two seasons he spent at the club, he won two Centro Championships and reached two Copa del Rey finals in 1917 and 1918, starting in both of them and scoring the winning goal in the extra-time of the former against Arenas de Getxo in a 2–1 win.

Despite playing a key role in Madrid's back-to-back Copa del Rey finals, the club's board of directors decided that both Álvarez and Rey, were no longer needed, and so, they both returned to Racing at the end of the 1918–19 season, and in their first season back, they contributed decisively in helping Racing win the 1918–19 Centro Championship four points clear of Madrid. This was Álvarez's third Championship in a row. He then had a three-year stint with Espanyol, before returning to Racing once again where he retired in 1927.

International career
Being a Racing de Madrid player, he was eligible to play for the Madrid national team, being a member of the Madrid side that participated in the first edition of the Prince of Asturias Cup in 1915, an inter-regional competition organized by the RFEF. Álvarez also participated in the following edition, which consisted of a two-legged tie against Catalonia, and he scored an equalizer in the first leg, although Madrid still lost 3–6.

He was part of the Madrid side that reached the final of the 1923–24 Prince of Asturias Cup, and although he did not play in the infamous final against Catalonia which ended in a 4–4 draw, Álvarez then started in the replay of the final on 26 February 1924, replacing Gonzalo in a 2–3 loss to their regional rivals.

Honours

Club
Madrid FC
Centro Championship
Winners (2): 1916–17, 1917–18

Copa del Rey:
Winners (1): 1917
Runner-up (1): 1918

Racing de Madrid
Centro Championship
Winners (1): 1918–19

International
Madrid
Prince of Asturias Cup:
Runner-up (1): 1916 and 1923–24

References

1897 births
1955 deaths
Spanish footballers
Association football wingers
Real Madrid CF players
Footballers from Madrid